"The Points" is a rap song performed by The Notorious B.I.G., Coolio, Big Mike, Buckshot, Redman, Ill Al Skratch, Bone Thugs-n-Harmony and Busta Rhymes. It was released in 1995 via Mercury Records/PolyGram as a single from Panther (The Original Motion Picture Soundtrack). The song peaked at 80 on the Billboard Hot R&B/Hip-Hop Singles & Tracks chart.

Contributing artists
In order of appearance:

The Notorious B.I.G.
Coolio
Redman
Ill Al Skratch 
Big Mike
Busta Rhymes
Buckshot
Bone Thugs-n-Harmony

Charts

References

External links

Posse cuts
1995 singles
Coolio songs
Hip hop songs
Busta Rhymes songs
All-star recordings
Jamal (rapper) songs
Redman (rapper) songs
Mercury Records singles
Songs written by Coolio
Bone Thugs-n-Harmony songs
The Notorious B.I.G. songs
Songs written by Sean Price
Songs written by Busta Rhymes
Songs written by Jamal (rapper)
Songs written by Redman (rapper)
Songs written by the Notorious B.I.G.
Song recordings produced by Easy Mo Bee